State assembly elections were held in Malaysia on 25 April 1995 in all states except Sabah and Sarawak.

Results

Perlis

Kedah

Kelantan

Terengganu

Penang

Perak

Pahang

Selangor

Negeri Sembilan

Malacca

Johor

References

State elections in Malaysia
state